Berende may refer to:

 Berendei, a Pecheneg tribe
 Berende, Pernik Province, a village in Bulgaria
 Berende, Sofia Province, a village in Bulgaria
 Berende Izvor, a village in Bulgaria